Morteza Momayez (August 26, 1936 – October 25, 2005) was an Iranian graphic designer. He was one of the founders of Iranian Graphic Design Society (IGDS) and held a membership to Alliance Graphique Internationale (AGI). He was the president of Tehran International Poster Biennial and Editor-in-chief of “Neshan”. Throughout his career, Momayez initiated  many cultural institutes, exhibitions and graphic design publications. In 2004, Momayez received the Art & Culture Award of Excellency from President Mohammad Khatami.

Biography

Morteza Momayez was born on August 26, 1936, in Tehran to Mohammad-Ali and Kochak Momayez.

In 1965, he completed his undergraduate studies in painting at University of Tehran's College of Fine Arts. He subsequently continued his studies at École Nationale Supérieure des Arts Décoratifs in Paris, where he received his diplomat in 1968. He served as the art director and graphic designer for the Tehran International Film Festival between 1973 to 1977.

Experiences: Graphic Design Magazines: Iran Abad (1960), Ketab va Keyhan Hafteh (1961–62), Farhang (1961), Kavosh (1963–64), Negin (1965), Farhang va Zendegi (1969–78),Roudaki (1971-1978), Cinema (1974–75), Memari va Honareh Iran (1987), Kelk (1990-),Neghahe No (1991–99), Sharif (1993-2001),Tasvir (1992), Silk Road (1994–95), Faslnameh Khavarmyaneh ( 1994), Goftego (1994-), Payam-e-Emrouz (1994–2000).

Awards
2004 National Award of Art achievements from the Academy of Art in Tehran.

References

External links
Official homepage

Iranian graphic designers
People from Tehran
1936 births
2005 deaths
École nationale supérieure des arts décoratifs alumni
Iranian poster artists
Recipients of the Order of Culture and Art
Iranian Science and Culture Hall of Fame recipients in Visual Arts